There have been several treaties of Arras:
 Treaty of Arras (1435), between Charles VII of France and Philip the Good of Burgundy
 Treaty of Arras (1482), between Louis XI of France and the governments of the Low Countries
 Treaty of Arras (1579), signed in May 1579
 Union of Arras (January 1579), the pledge of loyalty to Spain by the Southern Netherlands